Otto Lucien Anton "Tony" Spaeth', Jr. February 6, 1934 - January 13, 2021 – born in Saint Louis, Missouri – was a corporate identity planner, consultant, critic and teacher. His work developed the premise that institutional branding systems are best understood as tools of leadership – tools to establish directional clarity, motivate performance, and affect structural change as well as to revitalize market presence:

Early years
During his childhood, Spaeth's parents took in Anthony Bailey (then himself a child) as a war refugee; Bailey has since told the story of their shared childhood years in the books America, Lost & Found and England, First & Last.

Later work

From a base in Rye, New York, since 1990 Spaeth has provided identity planning and creative counsel to scores of clients in diverse categories.  He is credited with such corporate brands as Dow Jones, Eastman Chemical, Celera Genomics, Flowserve, Commonfund, FIRST Robotics and Outward Bound USA.

Since 1998, on his website Identityworks.com - a service of Tony Spaeth / Identity (now discontinued), Spaeth reviewed noteworthy new identities of strategic or creative interest, with appropriate credit to chief executives and designers alike. The site also provided a variety of analytic and planning tools for branding and design students worldwide, and contained Identity Forum, where a global panel of leading thinkers and practitioners addressed identity issues.

Spaeth's annual rebrandings overview in The Conference Board Review magazine provided a significant record covering more than two decades of Corporate Identity change:

External links
 Identity Forum
 Corporate Brand Matrix
 Princeton Project 55
 Partners of '63

References

Brand management
Market researchers
1934 births
Harvard Business School alumni
Princeton University School of Architecture alumni
Living people